Monika Stützle (born 5 July 1953) is a German speed skater. She competed in two events at the 1972 Winter Olympics.

References

1953 births
Living people
German female speed skaters
Olympic speed skaters of West Germany
Speed skaters at the 1972 Winter Olympics
Sportspeople from Munich